"Glow" is a 1985 single by Rick James from his album of the same title. The single was James' tenth release to reach the top ten on the R&B singles chart, peaking at number five.  On the dance chart, the single was his second and final number one. Both James’ appearance and the song were featured in The A-Team Episode The Heart Of Rock 'N Roll (1985).

References

1985 singles
Rick James songs
Gordy Records singles
1984 songs
Songs written by Rick James
Song recordings produced by Rick James